The 1970 Louisville Cardinals football team was an American football team that represented the University of Louisville in the Missouri Valley Conference (MVC) during the 1970 NCAA University Division football season. Under second-year head coach Lee Corso, the Cardinals compiled an 8–3–1 record (4–0 in MVC), played Long Beach State to a tie in the Pasadena Bowl, and outscored their opponents 252 to 208.

The team's statistical leaders included John Madeya with 1,602 passing yards, Bill Gatti with 941 rushing yards, Cookie Brinkman with 599 receiving yards, and Larry Hart with 48 points scored. Punter and kicker Scott Marcus was featured in an article in Sports Illustrated.

Schedule

Roster

References

External links
 Card Chronicle – Louisville bowl flashback – 1970 Pasadena Bowl

Louisville
Louisville Cardinals football seasons
Missouri Valley Conference football champion seasons
Louisville Cardinals football